Marti Pellow (born Mark McLachlan; 23 March 1965) is a Scottish singer. He was the lead singer of the Scottish pop group Wet Wet Wet for 28 years: from their formation in 1982 until their split in 1997, and again from their reformation in 2004 to his departure in 2017. He has also recorded albums as a solo artist, and performed as an actor in musical theatre productions in both the West End and on Broadway.

Early life
Pellow's first exposure to music occurred around the age of 7. He would listen to his mother's Barras-bought 8-track record collection of Burt Bacharach and Hal David, but it was the soul genre of the selection that drew him in. Early Marvin Gaye and, especially, Sam Cooke captivated him. He then discovered live music. "Hey, wait a minute – check that picture: not only is this music amazing, but these guys deliver it live? That's for me."

When he told his father about the direction he wanted his life to take, he was less than enthusiastic. "'Are you on a hallucinogenic substance or something? What's wrong with getting out there and getting an apprenticeship? I'm a builder, your grandfather was a builder, your great-grandfather was a shipbuilder. What do you want to be a musician for?' And I said, 'No, you don't understand – this is my vocation in life; this is what I want to be'."

In 1982, at the age of seventeen, McLachlan, who was training to be a painter and decorator, formed a band with three friends from Clydebank High School in his hometown. The friends were Tommy Cunningham, Graeme Clark and Neil Mitchell, and the band's name was Vortex Motion. This was subsequently changed to Wet Wet Wet, a title taken from the Scritti Politti song "Gettin, Havin' and Holdin'". McLachlan also changed his birth name in favour of the stage name Marti Pellow, created from his mother's maiden name Pellow and the nickname he was given at school (“Smarty”).

Wet Wet Wet

Pellow enjoyed success with Wet Wet Wet throughout the late 1980s and 1990s. However, in 1997 drummer Tommy Cunningham left the band over a royalties dispute and its success waned immediately. Pellow was by this time addicted to heroin. On finally overcoming his addiction, he stated: "It was textbook. I couldn't function without it. But there's no romantic side to heroin – it's no good."

Pellow left Wet Wet Wet in May 1999, effectively disbanding the group. They reformed, however, in March 2004. On 28 July 2017, Pellow departed from Wet Wet Wet to focus on his solo career.

Solo career
Pellow began his career as a solo artist in association with Chris Difford of Squeeze. The two met while they were patients in The Priory in March 1999. Difford subsequently became Pellow's lyricist and unofficial helper.

In November 1999, Pellow began his first solo tour. On 4 June 2001, he released "Close to You" from his debut solo album, Smile. A further single, "I've Been Around the World", was released that November; towards the end of the year he embarked on a seven-date tour (the Smile Tour) around Britain. In 2002, he hosted and sang in Girls' Night Out, one of a week of shows in aid of the Teenage Cancer Trust, at the Royal Albert Hall. This led to him, in 2002, being offered the part of Billy Flynn, the lawyer in the musical Chicago in London's West End and, in 2004, on Broadway. Also in 2002, Pellow released Marti Pellow Sings the Hits of Wet Wet Wet & Smile, an 18-track compilation that included three songs from the latter album.

In November 2003, he issued an album of cover versions, Between the Covers, the single from which was Neil Young's "A Lot of Love".

At the end of June 2004, the reformed band went to a secret location to record tracks for a new album and to prepare for a UK tour. At the tour's conclusion, Pellow recorded Moonlight Over Memphis, with the record producer Willie Mitchell (Al Green, Otis Clay, Ann Peebles, etc.), demonstrating a deep affinity with southern soul. The album was released in October 2006 on DMG TV, a label which has had some success previously with albums by such artists as Jane McDonald and Daniel O'Donnell. Pellow went on tour during October and November to support the album, with a helping hand from regular Wets contributor Graeme Duffin.

Pellow won the second series of the prime-time BBC1 show Just the Two of Us, which began on 2 January 2007, partnering actress Hannah Waterman.

Between February and July 2007, Pellow performed at several jazz clubs and at jazz festivals (Ronnie Scott's Jazz Club and The Pigalle Club in London being two examples), the Cheltenham Jazz Festival and "Ronnie Scott's in the Park" in Woburn. These gigs were followed in April 2008 by the release of his jazz album, Sentimental Me, on Rhino Records (UK), containing well-known jazz songs he sang at the above-mentioned gigs and a self-penned song, as well as an accompanying tour throughout the UK.

In May 2008, Pellow appeared in Sir Tim Rice's concert revival of his hit musical Chess, playing the "Arbiter". The concert took place at the Royal Albert Hall on 12 May and 13 May 2008. In June 2009 it aired on British and American television and was released on DVD.

From late August 2008 until early May 2009 he was playing the leading role in a revival of the musical The Witches of Eastwick.

In May 2010, Pellow released his fourth studio album, entitled Devil and the Monkey, to coincide with a seven-date arena tour with George Benson, performing songs from his new album as well as hits from his solo and Wet Wet Wet career.

2011 saw the release of his Love To Love album, a fully orchestrated and romantic tribute to his favourite love songs that saw Pellow back in the UK charts, as well as starring in a touring production of Broadway musical Jekyll & Hyde, beginning in January at The Churchill Theatre, Bromley, and ran to the end of July 2011.

On 17 August 2012, Pellow performed his new concert show Boulevard of Life with the RTÉ Concert Orchestra at Dublin's National Concert Hall.  The conductor for the show was Fiachra Trench, a previous collaborator.  It showcased songs from his 30-year career, both with the band and from his work in musical theatre.

It was also announced that Pellow has been cast in The Sung Thoughts of the Journalist in the 2012–13 arena tour of Jeff Wayne's Musical Version of The War of the Worlds – Alive on Stage!  The New Generation.

Pellow appeared as Che Guevara in Evita on tour around the UK in 2013, and subsequently reprised the role in a limited-run West End production of the musical from 15 September 2014 at the Dominion Theatre.

Pellow played the narrator in Willy Russell's Blood Brothers at Hastings White Rock Theatre between 23 and 28 March 2015.

In 2021, he confirmed the release of new single "These Are the Days" and album Stargazer.

Personal life
In October 2003, Pellow's then-ex-bandmates attended his mother's funeral, a show of support that touched the grieving frontman. "I thought it was a powerful gesture," Pellow said. "Moments like that put things into perspective – it wasn't all about music, it was more about a kinship between us. I remember my mother once saying, 'Maybe Wet Wet Wet will get back together again one day'. She must have had a wee vision. I'd never closed the chapter on the band; I'd always left the door open."

Pellow supports Rangers.

Discography

Albums

Singles

References

External links
Official website
Marti Pellow at MySpace

1961 births
Living people
Wet Wet Wet members
21st-century Scottish male singers
Scottish pop singers
Scottish singer-songwriters
Scottish male musical theatre actors
Singing talent show winners
People from Clydebank
People educated at Clydebank High School
20th-century Scottish male singers